M. Thompson (full name and dates of birth and death unknown) was an English cricketer.  Thompson's batting style is unknown.

Thompson made two first-class appearances for Middlesex, both against Lancashire in 1866.  In the first match at Old Trafford, Manchester, Thompson was dismissed for a 5 runs by John Smith, with Middlesex making 134.  In response Lancashire made 181, with Middlesex making 269 in their second-innings, with Thompson ending that innings unbeaten on 4 runs.  Lancashire were dismissed for 168 in their chase, handing Middlesex a 54 run victory.  In the second match at the Cattle Market Ground, Islington, Lancashire made 146 in their first-innings.  Middlesex made 202 in response, with Thompson last man out when he was run out for a duck.  Lancashire were dismissed for 142 in their second-innings, leaving Middlesex to chase down a target of 87 to win.  Middlesex reached their target, losing just 4 wickets in the process.  Thompson was not required to bat during the chase.  These were his only major appearances for Middlesex.

References

External links
M. Thompson at ESPNcricinfo
M. Thompson at CricketArchive

English cricketers
Middlesex cricketers